This is a list of the bus routes in Shenzhen, China, including all of the bus routes operating in Shenzhen and Inter-city bus service between Shenzhen and its neighboring cities, Huizhou, Dongguan or Hong Kong.

Operators

Numbering

Routes with E/M/B prefixes 
E/M/B Prefixes Numbering Plan was issued by Transport Bureau of Shenzhen in Dec. 2008.

Exceptions:
 Routes M139 and M447 also travel through expressways, and they can be defined as Express routes.
 Routes M191, M199, M348, M362, M380, M437, M520 and M528 travel through expressways, but they are defined as Main-line routes.

Routes without prefixes 
These routes are using former numbering plan now and may gradually be replaced by routes with E/M/B prefixes.

Exceptions:
 Routes 8, 43, 58, 60, 61, 74, 75, 81, 82, 85, 836 and 977 travel across the former border.
 Both of the terminals of route 222 are in central Shenzhen, yet it travels across the former border twice.
 Route 882 travels through Bao'an District, Longhua District, Guangming District and Longgang District.

Routes with other prefixes 

There are also Inter-city bus routes from neighboring cities using their numbering systems. Please check their lists for details.

Notes for route number display 

Note that temporary route changes may be implemented without notice here, due to existed road constructions or COVID-19 pandemic restrictions.

Express Routes

Main-line Routes

M102-M199

M200-M299

M300-M399

M400-M499

M500-M597

Branch Routes

B601-B699

B708-B789

B811-B899

B900-B992

Routes of former numbering plan

1-97

101-236

303-395

603-791

802-982

Nightly routes

Airport routes

Peak-time Route series

Peak-time routes

Peak-time Express routes

Travelling Routes

Dapeng holiday routes 
These are routes reaching or inside Dapeng New District, where tourism is one of the main industries. They are listed in order of Chinese Pinyin alphabet.

Sightseeing routes

Other holiday routes 
These routes are listed in order of Pinyin alphabet, and mostly by Chinese names of their destination scenic spots.

Routes involving Shenzhen-Shanwei Special Cooperative Zone

Regular routes

Peak-time routes

Inter-city Routes

Dongguan bus routes to Shenzhen 
Note that bus routes 216, 312, 781, 789 and 915 here belong to Dongguan Bus Co, ltd, not to be confused with routes of Shenzhen bus operators with the same numbers.

Huizhou bus routes to Shenzhen

Hong Kong bus routes to Shenzhen

Shenzhen bus routes to neighboring cities 
These routes have been already mentioned above with indications in the Note column: M136, M181, M184, M185, M187, M188, M189, M286, M318, M325, M360, M361, M464, M478, M497, M589, 高峰66, 高峰123 and 高快86. Please review for details.

Customized routes 
Please search these routes with apps named "E巴士"(operated by Shenzhen Eastern Bus) or "优点巴士"(operated by Shenzhen Bus Group).

References

External links 
 Bus info - 8684 Shenzhen (in Chinese)
 List of bus routes and stops in Shenzhen - Transport Bureau of Shenzhen Municipality (in Chinese)
 Transport info - Bendibao Shenzhen (in Chinese)
 Wechat official account of Pubilc Transport Management Bureau of Shenzhen (in Chinese. Download and use WeChat social app to scan the QR code in the link to follow the account and check information.)

bus
Shenzhen